¿Vieja yo? (English title: Never too late, Lit: Old me?) is a Venezuelan telenovela written by Mónica Montañez and produced by Venevisión in 2008.

On 11 September 2008, Venevisión started broadcasting ¿Vieja yo? weekdays at 9:00pm, replacing Torrente. The last episode was broadcast on 7 March 2009. The theme for the telenovela La Vieja Esa was sung by Chino & Nacho.

Mimi Lazo and Adrián Delgado starred as protagonists, while Marjorie De Sousa and Jean Carlo Simancas starred as antagonists.

Plot
Margot Ramírez is a fifty-year-old woman who yearns for more from life after being stuck in a boring marriage to Justo, a man who ignores her and who is cheating on her with a younger woman. Although she is physically attractive, she is past her prime, but she is still determined to fulfill her dreams of becoming an actress, seeing her family happy and finding a man who will fulfill her.

One day, Margot applies for a casting call for actors to appear in a commercial for a popular department store where her husband also works. This is a lifetime opportunity for Margot, and she is asked to put her acting skills to the test by posing as the store's new general manager, a scheme created by the store's owner. While working here, she falls in love with José Antonio, the stores owner's grandson, thus making her feel young again. However, their relationship will face rough challenges such as José Antonio girlfriend, Estefania, who cannot understand why he is in love with a woman old enough to be his mother while ignoring her youthful beauty.

Cast

 Mimi Lazo as Margot Batalla de Ramírez
 Adrian Delgado as José Antonio Martínez García
 Marjorie De Sousa as  Estefanía Urrutia Blanco
 Jean Carlo Simancas as Justo Ramírez
 Carlota Sosa as Josefina García Bellini Vda. de Martínez
 Carolina Perpetuo as Rosalía Torres de Estaba
 Rafael Romero as Ildemaro Blanco
 Sonia Villamizar as Martha Fuentes
 Rolando Padilla as Fran Meléndez
 Elaiza Gil as Ixora Fuentes
 Antonio Delli as Wincho Estaba
 María Antonieta Duque as Tamara Luján de Meléndez
 Juan Manuel Montesinos as Joaquín Urrutia
 Laureano Olivares as Alberto Sánchez "El Topo"
 Eva Blanco as Clemencia Batalla
 Chelo Rodríguez as Marisol Pérez de Martínez
 Raúl Amundaray as José I Martínez "Don Pipo"
 Alejo Felipe as Ariel Gil
 Caridad Canelon as Aracelis Sánchez
 Mirtha Pérez as La madre de Tamara
Freddy Galavis as Nemecio Bello
 José Manuel Suárez as Justo "Justito" Ramírez Batalla
 Sindy Lazo as Milagros Urrutia Blanco
 Pastor Oviedo as Diego Sánchez
 Mario Sudano as Yony Frías
 Erika Schwarzgruber as Daniela Estaba Torres
 Erika Santiago as Esperanza Martínez
 Virginia Lancaster as Nancy Peña
 Marjorie Magri as Elizabeth Ramírez Batalla
 Deive Garcés as José Enrique Flores "Cheito"
 Héctor Zambrano as Héctor Bambino
 Regino Giménez as Friita
 Genesis Oldenbug as Mikaela Meléndez Luján
 Daniel Sarcos as Camionero de la colchonería
 Luis "Moncho" Martínez as Camionero de la colchonería
 Edgardo Márquez as Camionero de la colchonería
 Manuel Salazar as Juan Crisóstomo
 Reinaldo José Pérez as Hércules Buendía
 Lisbeth Manrique as Helena
 José Luis Useche as Patrocinio Bracho
 Alejandra Machado as Justicia "Ticia" Ramírez

References

External links

2008 telenovelas
Venevisión telenovelas
2008 Venezuelan television series debuts
2009 Venezuelan television series endings
Venezuelan telenovelas
Spanish-language telenovelas
Television shows set in Caracas